Khemis Miliana District is a district of Aïn Defla Province, Algeria.

Municipalities
The district is further divided into two municipalities.
Khemis Miliana
Sidi Lakhdar

Notable people
Mohamed Belhocine (born 1951), Algerian medical scientist, professor of internal medicine and epidemiology.

References

Districts of Aïn Defla Province